Jorge Osvaldo Bartero (born 28 December 1957 in Buenos Aires) is a retired Argentine football goalkeeper. He played for a number of clubs in Argentina.

In 1987, he was a reserve goalkeeper in the Argentina that participated in the Copa América.

Bartero spent the majority of his career with Vélez Sársfield, he also played in the Argentine Primera with Unión de Santa Fe and Racing Club de Avellaneda. Towards the end of his career he played in the Argentine 2nd division with Deportivo Italiano and Chacarita Juniors.

He currently works as a goalkeeping coach in Vélez Sársfield.

References

External links
 Argentine Primera statistics (post 1989) 
 Jorge Bartero at BDFA.com.ar 

1957 births
Living people
Footballers from Buenos Aires
Argentine footballers
1987 Copa América players
Association football goalkeepers
Club Atlético Vélez Sarsfield footballers
Unión de Santa Fe footballers
Racing Club de Avellaneda footballers
Chacarita Juniors footballers
Argentine Primera División players
Pan American Games bronze medalists for Argentina
Medalists at the 1987 Pan American Games
Footballers at the 1987 Pan American Games
Pan American Games medalists in football